The Odernheim Formation is a geologic formation in Germany. It preserves fossils dating back to the Carboniferous and Permian periods.

See also 
 List of fossiliferous stratigraphic units in Germany

References

External links 
 

Geologic formations of Germany
Carboniferous System of Europe
Carboniferous Germany
Permian System of Europe
Permian Germany
Paleontology in Germany